By-elections to the 29th Alberta Legislature have been held to fill vacancies in the Legislative Assembly of Alberta after the 2015 election. To date, two by-elections have been held to fill vacancies in the 29th Alberta Legislature.

The 29th Alberta Legislature was formed after the 2015 election, during which the New Democrats won their first majority government under the leadership of Rachel Notley. Three by-elections since have been in ridings which were initially won by the Progressive Conservatives, and have returned one Wildrose, one Progressive Conservative, and one United Conservative member each to the legislature. Two held in ridings initially won by Wildrose returned United Conservative members.

Summary table

Fort McMurray-Conklin
There will be a by-election in Fort McMurray-Conklin due to the March 5, 2018 resignation of United Conservative Party MLA and former Wildrose Party leader Brian Jean. The by-election is being held on July 12, 2018.

Innisfail-Sylvan Lake
There will be a by-election in Innisfail-Sylvan Lake due to United Conservative Party MLA Don MacIntyre's sudden resignation on February 5, 2018 after he was charged with sexual assault and "sexual interference" (i.e., touching a minor for a sexual purpose) The by-election is being held on July 12, 2018.

Calgary-Lougheed
The by-election was held when Dave Rodney resigned his seat on November 1, 2017 to make way for Jason Kenney, the leader of the newly-formed United Conservative Party. Kenney ended up winning the byelection and held the seat for the United Conservative Party.

|}

Calgary-Greenway
The riding of Calgary-Greenway was left vacant on November 23, 2015, when incumbent Progressive Conservative MLA Manmeet Bhullar was killed in a vehicle accident on Alberta Highway 2. The resulting by-election was won by Prabhdeep Gill of the Progressive Conservatives.

The by-election resulted in a Progressive Conservative hold, but saw the vote share for that party drop by 15 points from the 2015 election.

Calgary-Foothills
Following the Alberta Progressive Conservatives' defeat in the 2015 provincial election, outgoing premier Jim Prentice announced on election night that even though he had personally won re-election in Calgary-Foothills, he was resigning his seat in the legislature. This had the effect of voiding the election result, and necessitated the calling of a by-election to fill the seat.

The by-election to succeed him was scheduled for September 3, 2015, and was won by Prasad Panda of the Wildrose Party. Panda's victory increased the Wildrose caucus to 22 members in the Legislature, and kept the Progressive Conservatives at 9.

References

Elections in Alberta
Provincial by-elections in Alberta